Scopula perlata, the cream wave, is a moth of the family Geometridae. The species was first described by Francis Walker in 1861. It is found in Australia (including Tasmania, New South Wales, South Australia and Victoria), as well as Indonesia.

The wingspan is about 20 mm. Adults are variable in colour, ranging from pale green to yellow.

The larvae have been reared on Myosotis arvensis. They are fawn with small lateral dots on each side. Early instars are striped, but these stripes disappear in later instars. Full-grown larvae reach a length of about 20 mm. Pupation takes place in leaf litter.

References

Moths described in 1861
perlata
Moths of Australia
Moths of Indonesia